7 Sinners is the 13th studio album by German power metal band Helloween, released in 2010. A video clip for "Are You Metal?" was released 11 October 2010. The whole album could be heard on Myspace a week before the physical release. For the first time since 2000's The Dark Ride, each song on the album is a solo composition, i.e. each member has written both the music and lyrics to his song with no additional input from any other member.  7 Sinners sold 1,900 copies in its first week of release in the U.S.

Commenting on the album, bassist Markus Grosskopf said:

Track listing

Personnel
 Andi Deris – Vocals
 Michael Weikath – Guitar
 Sascha Gerstner – Guitar, backing vocals
 Markus Grosskopf – Bass
 Dani Löble – Drums

Additional personnel:
 Matthias Ulmer – Keyboards
 Eddy Wrapiprou – Keyboards
 Eberhard Hahn – Flute solo on "Raise the Noise"
 William "Billy" King and Olaf Senkbeil – Choirs
 Ron Deris – Additional backing vocals on "Far in the Future"
 Biff Byford – Spoken prologue to 'Who is Mr. Madman?' Also voiced the intro on their last studio album Gambling with the Devil.
 Marcos Moura – Pumpkins Illustrations

Charts

References

2010 albums
Helloween albums
Spinefarm Records albums
SPV/Steamhammer albums
Albums produced by Charlie Bauerfeind